The Okumino Pumped Storage Power Station is a pumped-storage hydroelectric power station in Motosu in Gifu Prefecture, Japan.

See also

Kamiōsu Dam
List of pumped-storage hydroelectric power stations
Hydroelectricity in Japan

References

Pumped-storage hydroelectric power stations in Japan